Ilkka "Ila" Teromaa (3 September 1953 – 21 June 2017) was a Finnish speedway rider who rode in the British League for Leicester Lions and Cradley Heathens in the late 1970s and early 1980s.

After riding for three years for the Tampere Aces, Teromaa joined Leicester Lions in 1975, becoming a heat leader by the end of the year and winning the 1975 Finnish individual championship. In 1976 he was the top scorer for the Lions. His season was interrupted by injury in 1977 but he continued to score well in 1978. He stayed until 1979 when he was transferred to the Heathens during the season after his form had dropped, averaging below 6 points. A disappointing 1980 season for the Heathens saw his average drop below 5 points. 
Teromaa rode in the 1978 World Final, finishing in eleventh place after scoring six points.

During the last two years of his speedway career he lost interest in the sport and decided that it was soon time to retire, settle down and start a family. Teromaa rode his last speedway season (1981) for the German club Brockstedt. He and his wife moved back to Finland in November 1981, two weeks before their first child was born.

Ila's younger brother Pepe was also a speedway rider, and the two rode together in the Leicester Lions team in 1976 and 1977.

Teromaa died on 21 June 2017 due to complications from surgery.

World Final Appearances

Individual World Championship
 1978 -  London, Wembley Stadium - 11th - 6pts

World Pairs Championship
 1977 -  Manchester, Hyde Road (with Kai Niemi) - 6th - 14pts (7)
 1979 -  Vojens, Vojens Speedway Center (with Kai Niemi) - 7th - 7pts (0)
 1980 -  Krsko, Matija Gubec Stadium (with Kai Niemi) - 6th - 14pts (8)

References

1953 births
2017 deaths
Finnish speedway riders
Cradley Heathens riders
Leicester Lions riders
Sportspeople from Tampere
Deaths from surgical complications